The 1975 All-Pacific-8 Conference football team consists of American football players chosen by the United Press International (UPI) and the conference coaches as the best players by position in the Pac-8 Conference during the 1975 NCAA Division I football season. The UPI selections included players from non-Pac-8 teams.

The 1975 UCLA Bruins football team won the Pac-8 championship and was ranked No. 5 in the final AP Poll. Four UCLA players were selected to the first team: quarterback John Sciarra; guards Randy Cross and Phil McKinnely; and defensive tackle Cliff Frazier.

Offensive selections

Quarterbacks
 John Sciarra, UCLA (Coaches-1)
 Craig Penrose, San Diego State (UPI-1)

Running backs
 Ricky Bell, USC (UPI-1; Coaches-1)
 Chuck Muncie, California (UPI-1; Coaches-1)

Wide receivers
 Steve Rivera, California (UPI-1; Coaches-1)
 Tony Hill, Stanford (UPI-1; Coaches-1)

Tight ends
 Ted Pappas, Stanford (UPI-1; Coaches-1)

Tackles
 Ted Albrecht, California (UPI-1; Coaches-1)
 Marvin Powell, USC (UPI-1; Coaches-1)

Guards
 Randy Cross, UCLA (UPI-1; Coaches-1)
 Phil McKinnely, UCLA (UPI-1; Coaches-1)
 Alex Karakozoff, Stanford (Coaches-1)

Centers
 Ray Pinney, Washington (UPI-1; Coaches-1)

Defensive selections

Defensive ends
 Gary Jeter, USC (UPI-1; Coaches-1)
 Duncan McColl, Stanford (UPI-1; Coaches-1)

Defensive tackles
 Cliff Frazier, UCLA (UPI-1; Coaches-1)
 Mark Husfloen, Washington State (UPI-1)

Linebackers
 Phil Heck, California (UPI-1)
 Bob Horn, Oregon State (UPI-1; Coaches-1)
 Dan Lloyd, Washington (UPI-1; Coaches-1)
 Kevin Bruce, USC (Coaches-1)
 Geb Church, Stanford (Coaches-1)

Defensive backs
 Al Burleson, Washington (UPI-1; Coaches-1)
 Mario Clark, Oregon (UPI-1; Coaches-1)
 Danny Reece, USC (UPI-1; Coaches-1)
 Chuck Wills, Oregon (UPI-1; Coaches-)

Special teams

Placekicker
 Mike Langford, Stanford (UPI-1; Coaches-1)

Punter
 Gavin Hedrick, Washington State (UPI-1; Coaches-1)

Key

UPI = United Press International

Coaches = Pacific-8 football coaches

See also
1975 College Football All-America Team

References

All-Pacific-8 Conference Football Team
All-Pac-12 Conference football teams